Dendrocystis is a genus of green algae, in the family Oocystaceae. There is a single species, Dendrocystis raoi.

References

External links

Scientific references

Scientific databases
 AlgaTerra database
 Index Nominum Genericorum

Trebouxiophyceae genera
Chlorellales
Monotypic algae genera